Tachysbembix is a genus of ground beetles in the family Carabidae. There are at least two described species in Tachysbembix.

Species
These two species belong to the genus Tachysbembix:
 Tachysbembix sirena Erwin, 2004  (Costa Rica)
 Tachysbembix wendyporrasae Erwin, 2004  (Costa Rica)

References

Trechinae